Dragon Ball Z Kai (known in Japan as ) is a revised version of the anime series Dragon Ball Z, produced in commemoration of its 20th anniversary. Produced by Toei Animation, the series was originally broadcast in Japan on Fuji TV from April 5, 2009 to March 27, 2011. A follow-up series, which adapts the remaining story arcs from the original manga, was aired in Japan from April 6, 2014, to June 28, 2015.

Kai features remastered high definition picture, sound, and special effects as well as a re-recorded voice track by most of the original cast. As most of the series' sketches and animation cels had been discarded since the final episode of Dragon Ball Z in 1996, new frames were produced by digitally tracing over still frames from existing footage and filling them with softer colors. This reduced visible damage to the original animation. To convert the 4:3 animation to 16:9 widescreen, some shots were selectively cropped while others feature new hand drawn portions; an uncropped 4:3 version was made available on home video and international releases for the first 98 episodes. Some countries would also air it in 4:3. Much of the anime-exclusive material that was not featured in the original manga was cut from Kai (ultimately abridging the 291 episodes of Dragon Ball Z down to 167).

The series would return in 2014, running for an additional 61 episodes in Japan, and 69 episodes internationally. The international version of the 2014 series was titled Dragon Ball Z Kai: The Final Chapters by Toei Europe and Funimation, and had initially only been earmarked for broadcast outside of Japan. The home media releases of The Final Chapters contain a Japanese audio track for all episodes, including those that were never broadcast in Japan.

The first Blu-ray and DVD compilation was released in Japan on September 18, 2009. Individual volumes and Blu-ray box sets were released monthly. France was the first country to release all 167 episodes on Blu-ray and DVD.

Seasons overview

Episode list

Season 1: Saiyan Saga (2009)

Season 2: Frieza Saga (2009–2010)

Season 3: Androids Saga (2010)

Season 4: Cell Games Saga (2010–11)

Season 5: World Tournament Saga (2014)

Season 6: Majin Buu Saga (2014)

Season 7: Evil Buu Saga (2014–15)

Home releases

Japanese

DVD

Blu-ray

English

Volumes

Seasons

Complete Series

Notes

References

External links
 

Kai
Television series set on fictional planets

ja:ドラゴンボール改
zh:七龍珠改